Chester "Chet" Hajduk (July 21, 1918 – July 4, 2006) was an American Major League Baseball player who played in one game as a pinch hitter for the Chicago White Sox in 1941. Hajduk grounded out in his only at-bat, which came against Cleveland Indians pitcher Al Milnar. Hajduk enlisted with the US Navy in early 1942. Hajduk played with the Great Lakes Naval Station team, and was a member of the Armed Services team that played the American League All-Stars in an exhibition/fund raising game at Municipal Stadium in Cleveland on the 7th of July, 1942. After the war Hajduk settled in Niles, Illinois, becoming a successful building contractor and raising a family.

References

External links

1918 births
2006 deaths
Chicago White Sox players
Baseball players from Chicago
United States Navy personnel of World War II